Chiton is a sub-family of marine molluscs in the family Chitonidae.

Chiton may also refer to:

Chiton (costume), a form of clothing
Chiton (genus), a genus of marine molluscs in the family Chitonidae
Chiton, South Australia, a locality

See also